James Gopperth (born 29 June 1983) is a New Zealand professional rugby union player who plays for Leicester Tigers in Premiership Rugby, England's top tier. His regular playing positions are Centre and fly-half and he has played over 400 professional games in a 19-year career, scoring over 3,800 points. He has played professionally for Wellington, North Harbour, the Hurricanes & the Blues in his native New Zealand before moving to Europe in 2009 where he played for Newcastle Falcons in Premiership Rugby and Leinster in Ireland before joining Wasps in 2015 where he played 156 games over 7 years. He joined Leicester in 2022.

Early life

Gopperth was born in New Plymouth. He grew up on a farm with a rugby-supportive father.

Club career

New Zealand
Gopperth first played rugby for New Plymouth Boys' High School, before having his first break in the game and playing for the Old Boys University in the Wellington premier competition. Gopperth joined the Wellington Academy post High School in 2001 and after impressive displays for his club, Gopperth made his first-class debut for Wellington in 2002. Then, in 2003 at the age of 20, Gopperth signed a first-team contract with Wellington Lions. Gopperth went on to sign for the then Super 12 team Hurricanes in 2005.

Gopperth made a good start to his career with the Hurricanes when he made 12 appearances in the 2005 Super 12 season. All of his appearances during that season came from starts and he scored 139 points including three tries.

Gopperth finally got a chance to show what he could do in the 2005/2006 season, in the newly formed Super 14. He made seven starts during the season, but made in all 15 appearances during this season. He scored 86, with a further two tries and whilst playing 637 minutes.

During the 2006/2007 season Gopperth impressed for his club Wellington, although was unimpressive for his region the Hurricanes. In Super Rugby, Gopperth got 66 points in 13 appearances, still nowhere near his opening season tally, but for Wellington in the Air New Zealand Cup he got 121 points in just 10 games, mostly through the boot.

In his final season for the Hurricanes, Gopperth still could not reach his true form, only scoring 70 points in 12 games with a single try, but in the Air New Zealand Cup he scored an overall haul of 147 points in 12 games.

In 2008, Gopperth joined North Harbour and region Blues. During the 2008/2009 season Gopperth played 11 games and only started nine of them, but still managed to score 101 points with four tries. Then, Gopperth managed to rack up 90 points in 10 games for North Harbour in the Air New Zealand Cup, where he added two tries to his tally.

Europe
In 2009, only a season after joining the Blues, Gopperth joined Newcastle Falcons on a three-year deal replacing World Cup winner Jonny Wilkinson. In his first season Gopperth made 22 appearances, scoring two tries and a massive haul of 219 points, making him the league's top scorer. Gopperth, made an appearance for Newcastle Falcons in the Anglo-Welsh Cup, not scoring any points. Gopperth also ended the season as the top points scorer in the Amlin Challenge Cup scoring 74 points in seven appearances.
In the 2010/2011 season Gopperth again finished top scorer in the Premiership.

In March 2013 Gopperth was linked with a move to Leinster to compete with Ian Madigan for the starting number ten position being vacated by Johnny Sexton's proposed move to Racing Metro in France. On 29 March 2013, Leinster confirmed that Gopperth had signed for the Irish province.

In January 2015 Gopperth signed for Wasps.
During the 2016/17 season Gopperth won several awards, including three player of the year awards. He was named the Aviva Premiership player of the year, RPA Players' player of the year and Wasps' player of the year. He also won the golden boot for his 292 points scored during the same season, 102 points more than the next highest scorer, along with being named in the Premiership Dream Team, and winning the Citizen Try of the try Season award for his try against Northampton Saints in round four. At 33 years 333 days, he also became the oldest try scorer in a Premiership final.

Gopperth was announced as leaving Wasps on 2 February 2022, despite Wasps boss Lee Blackett confirming his destination as Leicester Tigers in February, Tigers did not confirm his signing until 12 May 2022.

International career
Gopperth has never played for his national team, the All Blacks, but has made two appearances for the second string team the Junior All Blacks. His appearances were during the 2006 Pacific Nations Cup, which the Junior All Blacks won both tests, vs Samoa and Tonga. Gopperth scored 26 and 21 points respectively for a total of 47 points in the two games; he scored three tries, with the remainder of his points coming from his kicking.

Personal life
Gopperth is married to Sarah Gopperth.

References

External links
ESPN Profile
Leinster Rugby Profile

1983 births
Living people
People educated at New Plymouth Boys' High School
Rugby union players from New Plymouth
New Zealand rugby union players
North Harbour rugby union players
Wellington rugby union players
Hurricanes (rugby union) players
Blues (Super Rugby) players
Newcastle Falcons players
Leicester Tigers players
Leinster Rugby players
Wasps RFC players
Rugby union fly-halves
New Zealand expatriate rugby union players
New Zealand expatriate sportspeople in England
New Zealand expatriate sportspeople in Ireland
Expatriate rugby union players in England
Expatriate rugby union players in Ireland